Elisabeth Maria Cornelia van Houts, Lady Baker (born 1952) is a Dutch-born British historian specializing in medieval European history. Van Houts was born in Zaandam in the Netherlands. She married historian Sir John Baker in 2010.

She is an Honorary Professor of Medieval European History in the Faculty of History and a Fellow of Emmanuel College, Cambridge.

Van Houts was elected a Fellow of the Royal Historical Society in 1983. She has published and lectured on Anglo-Norman history, medieval historiography and literature and the history of gender in the Middle Ages. She has been an expert panellist on the radio programme In Our Time for the 12th-century Renaissance and the Domesday Book.

Selected publications

References 

1952 births
Living people
20th-century Dutch historians
Dutch women historians
21st-century British historians
British women historians
Gender studies academics
Fellows of Emmanuel College, Cambridge
People from Zaanstad
University of Groningen alumni
Dutch expatriates in England
Alumni of Emmanuel College, Cambridge
Fellows of the Royal Historical Society